The 1979–80 Football League Cup was the 20th season of the Football League Cup, a knockout competition for England's top 92 football clubs. The winners qualified for the 1980–81 UEFA Cup, if not already qualified for European competition.
Wolverhampton Wanderers won the competition by defeating the reigning holders and European champions Nottingham Forest 1–0 in the final on 15 March 1980. This was their second League Cup success, after winning in 1974.

First round
The 56 Football League clubs who had comprised the Third and Fourth Divisions during the previous season, plus the bottom eight of the Second Division, all competed from the first round. Ties were two-legged affairs, with the away goals rule being applied after extra time where necessary. If teams could still not be divided, penalties were taken. Games were staged on 11/13 and 14–15 August 1979.

First Leg

Second Leg

Second round

The 28 first round winners were joined by the remaining clubs from the Second Division and all from the First Division. Ties for the first time in League Cup were two-legged affairs at this stage of the competition, with the away goals rule being applied after extra time where necessary. If teams could still not be divided, penalties were taken. Games were staged on 28–29 August and 3–5 September 1979.

First Leg

Second Leg

Third round
Ties were straight knockout games, with additional replays if required. The original games were staged on 25–26 September 1979.

Replays

2nd Replay

Fourth round
Ties were straight knockout games, with additional replays if required. The original games were staged on 30–31 October 1979.

Ties

Replays

Fifth round
Ties were straight knockout games, with additional replays if required.

Replays

2nd Replay

Semi-finals
Ties were once again two-legged affairs with the winners advancing to the final. Extra time and then penalties would be used in the second leg if required.

First leg

Second leg

Nottingham Forest won 2–1 on aggregate

Wolverhampton Wanderers won 4–3 on aggregate

Final

References

General

Specific

EFL Cup seasons
1979–80 domestic association football cups
Lea
Cup